Henriette Amelie de Nerha (Brussels, Austrian Netherlands, 1754 - Amsterdam, 19 June 1818), was a Dutch memoir writer, known for her relationship with Honoré Gabriel Riqueti, comte de Mirabeau. She was also a letter writer and corresponded with among others the famous Gilbert du Motier, Marquis de Lafayette. Her correspondence is preserved in the royal library and national archives of the Netherlands.

References 
 http://www.inghist.nl/Onderzoek/Projecten/DVN/lemmata/data/Nerha

1754 births
1818 deaths
Dutch memoirists
18th-century Dutch women writers
Writers of the Austrian Netherlands
Women memoirists
18th-century Dutch writers
Women of the Austrian Netherlands